The 2018–19 LEB Plata season was the 19th season of the Spanish basketball third league. It started on 6 October 2018 with the first round of the regular season and ended on 25 May 2019 with the promotion playoffs.

Format changes
On 2 June 2018, the General Assembly of the Spanish Basketball Federation agreed some changes in the competition format:

The competition will be expanded to 24 teams, divided into two groups of twelve by economical and geographical criteria. The top six teams of each group will join the group A1 for the promotion and the bottom six, the group A2 for avoiding relegation.
Three teams will be promoted to LEB Oro (the winner of the group A1 and the two playoffs winners) and six relegated to Liga EBA.
Four teams will join the playoffs for two more spots, decided by two-legged series.

Teams

Promotion and relegation (pre-season)
A total of 24 teams contested the league, including 10 sides from the 2017–18 season, two relegated from the 2017–18 LEB Oro, four promoted from the 2017–18 Liga EBA and eight guest teams according to the FEB criteria. On July 11, 2018, Isover Basket Azuqueca, CB Vic Universitat de Vic, Bàsquet Girona, Aquimisa Laboratorios Queso Zamorano, Igualitorio Cantabria Estela, Quesería La Antigua CB Tormes, TeslaCard Círculo Gijón and Zornotza Saskibaloi Taldea achieved the vacancies from the expansion to 24 teams.

Teams relegated from LEB Oro
Juaristi ISB
CB Clavijo

Teams promoted from Liga EBA
Marín Ence PeixeGalego
Afanion CB Almansa
Hestia Menorca
CB Villarrobledo

Teams relegated to Liga EBA
Xuven Cambados
Aquimisa Laboratorios Queso Zamorano (remained in the league achieving a vacant berth)
Agustinos Leclerc
CB Martorell

Teams that applied to participate
Bàsquet Girona
CB Vic Universitat de Vic
Igualitorio Cantabria Estela
Isover Basket Azuqueca
Quesería La Antigua CB Tormes
TeslaCard Círculo Gijón
Zornotza Saskibaloi Taldea

Venues and locations

First phase

Group East

League table

Positions by round
The table lists the positions of teams after completion of each round. In order to preserve chronological evolvements, any postponed matches are not included in the round at which they were originally scheduled, but added to the full round they were played immediately afterwards. For example, if a match is scheduled for round 13, but then postponed and played between rounds 16 and 17, it will be added to the standings for round 16.

Results

Group West

League table

Positions by round
The table lists the positions of teams after completion of each round. In order to preserve chronological evolvements, any postponed matches are not included in the round at which they were originally scheduled, but added to the full round they were played immediately afterwards. For example, if a match is scheduled for round 13, but then postponed and played between rounds 16 and 17, it will be added to the standings for round 16.

Results

Second phase

Group A1

League table

Positions by round
The table lists the positions of teams after completion of each round. In order to preserve chronological evolvements, any postponed matches are not included in the round at which they were originally scheduled, but added to the full round they were played immediately afterwards. For example, if a match is scheduled for round 3, but then postponed and played between rounds 6 and 7, it will be added to the standings for round 6.

Results

Group A2

League table

Positions by round
The table lists the positions of teams after completion of each round. In order to preserve chronological evolvements, any postponed matches are not included in the round at which they were originally scheduled, but added to the full round they were played immediately afterwards. For example, if a match is scheduled for round 3, but then postponed and played between rounds 6 and 7, it will be added to the standings for round 6.

Results

Promotion playoffs

|}
Source: FEB

Copa LEB Plata
The Copa LEB Plata was played on 22 December 2018, by the first qualified team of each group after the end of the first half of the season (round 11 of first phase).

Teams qualified

Game

Final standings

Awards
All official awards of the 2018–19 LEB Plata season.

MVP

Source:

All-LEB Plata Team

Source:

Copa LEB Plata MVP

Source:

Best Coach

Source:

Player of the round

First phase

Source: FEB, FEB

Second phase

Source: FEB, FEB

Promotion playoffs

Source: FEB

References and notes

External links
 Official website 

LEB2
LEB Plata seasons